Welcome Home is the sixth studio album by American heavy metal band Hellyeah. It was released on September 27, 2019, and is the last album to feature drummer and founding member Vinnie Paul before his death on June 22, 2018. Welcome Home was also the last album Hellyeah released before going on hiatus in 2021.

History 

On March 14, 2019, the band announced a new album would be released on June 28, and the song "333" was also released.

On May 13, the band announced Stone Sour drummer Roy Mayorga as the new tour drummer for Hellyeah, while also announcing "Welcome Home" as the title of their next album, with a new release date of September 27, 2019.

On May 17, a music video for the single and title track "Welcome Home" was released.

On June 28, the music video for "Oh My God" was released.

On August 8, E7 Music made the song "Perfect" available on YouTube.

On September 13, the song, "Black Flag Army" was released with a music video.

Critical reception 
Wall of Sound scored the album 7/10 and stated: "With such a solid offering like Welcome Home, the next chapter of the band will be interesting to watch, and I'm sure Vinnie Paul's spirit will be behind them". Kerrang! scored the album 4/5, calling it "a wonderful time, and a fitting farewell to an irreplaceable metal hero". Loudwire named it one of the 50 best rock albums of 2019.

Track listing 
All songs written by Chad Gray, Christian Brady, Tom Maxwell, Kyle Sanders, Vinnie Paul and Kevin Churko.

Personnel 
Chad Gray – vocals
Tom Maxwell – rhythm guitar
Christian Brady – lead guitar
Kyle Sanders – bass
Vinnie Paul – drums (pre-production)

Additional personnel 
Kevin Churko – producing, recording, engineering, editing, mixing, mastering
Tristan Hardin – additional recording and editing
Khloe Churko – general assistance and studio management
Steffen Orozco – additional editing
Bob Varo – additional editing
Sterling Winfield – pre-production

Charts

References

2019 albums
Hellyeah albums
Eleven Seven Label Group albums